Irving Lehman (January 28, 1876 – September 22, 1945) was an American lawyer and politician from New York. He was Chief Judge of the New York Court of Appeals from 1940 until his death in 1945.

Biography
He was born on January 28, 1876, in New York City to Mayer Lehman (d. 1897) and Babette Newgass and raised Jewish. Future New York State governor and United States Senator Herbert H. Lehman  was his brother. He graduated with an A.B. from Columbia College in 1896 and an LL.B. from Columbia University Law School in 1898.

He was a justice of the New York Supreme Court from 1909 to 1923, elected in 1908 on the Democratic ticket, and re-elected in 1922 on the Democratic and Republican tickets.

In 1923, he was elected on the Democratic and Republican tickets to a 14-year term on the New York Court of Appeals, and re-elected in 1937. In 1939, he was elected Chief Judge of the Court of Appeals on the Democratic, Republican and American Labor tickets, and remained on the bench until his death in office.

In 1942 the New York Court of Appeals affirmed the convictions of the notorious Louis Buchalter and his two associates Emanuel Weiss and Louis Capone under a sharply divided decision of the judges, who filed four opinions. The death sentences were upheld by a vote of 4–3. (People v. Buchalter, 289 N.Y. 181) However, Judge Lehman, who was also affirming the conviction of the three, expressed some doubts in the verdict and stated that the errors and defects in the case were in fact numerous. In 1943 the United States Supreme Court granted Buchalter's petition to review the case and in a full opinion affirmed the conviction, 7–0, with two justices abstaining. (319 U.S. 427 (1943)) Finally, Judge Lehman signed a show cause order in 1944 because the counsel for the trio had appeared before Governor Thomas E. Dewey in a clemency plea, and Lehman eventually delayed the execution of the condemned men. Even so, the clemency plea was denied by Governor Dewey. On March 4, 1944, Emanuel Weiss thanked Chief Judge Lehman in his final words before being electrocuted in Sing Sing.

Personal life
On June 26, 1901, he married Sissie Straus, the daughter of Nathan Straus, American merchant and philanthropist who co-owned two of New York City's biggest department stores, R.H. Macy & Company and Abraham & Straus. The couple was childless.

Lehman died of a heart ailment on September 22, 1945, at his home on Ridge Street in Port Chester, New York. Services were held at Temple Emanu El in Manhattan. He was buried at the Cypress Hills Cemetery.

References

Further reading
 Ingalls, Robert P. Herbert H. Lehman and New York's Little New Deal (1975) online

External links
  Nominated to Supreme Court, with short bio, in NYT on October 19, 1908
  Listing of Court of Appeals judges, with portrait (gives erroneously death date as September 21, all other sources give September 22)

1876 births
1945 deaths
American people of German-Jewish descent
American Reform Jews
Burials at Cypress Hills Cemetery
Chief Judges of the New York Court of Appeals
Columbia Law School alumni
Jewish American people in New York (state) politics
Lehman Brothers people
New York Supreme Court Justices
People from Port Chester, New York
Lehman family
Columbia College (New York) alumni
Straus family